Full Speed may refer to:

 Full Speed (1925 film), silent film western
 Full Speed (1934 film), Italian comedy film
 Full Speed (1996 film), French film
 Full Speed (album), the album by Kid Ink
 Full speed or flank speed, a nautical term referring to a ship's true maximum speed